Apodemia duryi, known generally as the Organ Mountain metalmark or Mexican metalmark, is a species of metalmark in the butterfly family Riodinidae.

The MONA or Hodges number for Apodemia duryi is 4402.3.

References

Further reading

 

Apodemia
Articles created by Qbugbot
Butterflies described in 1882